Albert McGinn (11 November 1913 – 20 August 2006) was an Australian cricketer. He played in four first-class matches for Queensland between 1941 and 1948.

See also
 List of Queensland first-class cricketers

References

External links
 

1913 births
2006 deaths
Australian cricketers
Queensland cricketers
Cricketers from Brisbane